Christina Gokey-Smith (born November 28, 1973) is an American racing cyclist, who rides for American amateur team . Before becoming a cyclist she competed in equestrianism.

Major results

2009
 8th Overall Tulsa Tough
2010
 3rd Overall Tulsa Tough
2011
 1st Overall Tulsa Tough
 3rd Athens Twilight Criterium
 7th Liberty Classic
2012
 6th Overall Tulsa Tough
 9th Overall Tour of Elk Grove
2013
 4th Overall Tulsa Tough
2014
 7th Overall Tour of America's Dairyland
2015
 2nd Overall Tulsa Tough
2016
 7th Overall Tour of America's Dairyland
 10th Overall Tulsa Tough

See also
 List of 2015 UCI Women's Teams and riders

References

External links
 

1973 births
Living people
American female cyclists
Sportspeople from Fort Worth, Texas
21st-century American women